Jami may refer to the following people:
Given name
Jami Attenberg (born 1971), American author
 Jami Bernard (born 1956), American author and media consultant
Jami Deadly (born 1979), American actress, glamour model, singer and burlesque dancer 
 Jami Floyd  (born 1964) American attorney
 Jami Gertz (born 1965), American actress
Jami Gong, Chinese-American stand-up comedian
Jami Kranich (born 1992), American footballer
 Jami Puustinen (born 1987), Finnish footballer
Jami Rafati (born 1994), Italian footballer
Jami Reid-Quarrell (born 1978), Scottish actor
Jami Rogers-Anderson (born 1970), American soprano opera singer
Jami-Lee Ross (born 1985), New Zealand politician
Jami Smith, American singer

Nickname

Surname
A. H. Jami (1953–2020), Indian cartoonist
 Catherine Jami (born 1961), French historian of Chinese mathematics
Ehsan Jami (born 1985), Dutch politician
Mehdi Jami (born 1961), Iranian journalist
Segundo Jami (born 1986), Ecuadorian runner 
Sheikh Ahmad-e Jami (1048–1141), a Persian writer, mystic and poet